The Spider is a British comic book character who began as a supervillain before becoming a superhero. He appeared in Lion between 26 June 1965 and 26 April 1969 and was reprinted in Vulcan. He was created by writer Ted Cowan and artist Reg Bunn. Superman co-creator Jerry Siegel took over the writing of the character with his third adventure, and would write the bulk of his adventures.

Publication history
The Spider first appeared in Lion from 26 June 1965 to 26 April 1969, as well as in Lion Annuals from 1967 to 1971. He would later be reprinted in Vulcan from 1975 to 1976. New material was also included in Fleetway's Super Stupendous Library series from 1967 to 1968.

His adventures were also reprinted in other countries, such as Germany (in Kobra), Spain, Italy, France, and others.

In 1992, 2000AD published an "Action Special" featuring The Spider (as well as other characters from the same era), written by Mark Millar at the start of his career.

An older, retired, more benevolent version of The Spider has appeared in UK writer/artist Paul Grist's Image comic book Jack Staff. Grist has created a name for the character, Alfred Chinard ("A. Chinard" is an anagram for "arachnid"), and the majority of fans consider this version a true, faithful revival of The Spider. The elderly Spider continues to appear in Jack Staff, although at IPC Media's request, he is identified merely as Alfred Chinard (as "The Spider" name is IPC Media copyright).

The Spider, along with other IPC characters, appeared in the Albion mini-series from the Wildstorm imprint of DC Comics. This incarnation of the character, while different to the version appearing in Jack Staff, is also named Alfred Chinard. 

The Spider is also mentioned in Jean-Patrick Manchette's 1976 crime novel West Coast Blues, where one of the villains reads his adventures. He is featured in one page of the book's graphic novel adaptation by Jacques Tardi, reprinted by Fantagraphics.

In April 2021, the Treasury of British Comics published a first volume of strips, that were originally serialised in Lion from 26 June 1965 to 18 June 1966 and the Lion Annual 1967. As well as a paperback edition, a limited edition hardback edition was available from the 2000 AD and Treasury of British Comic websites although both editions used the same ISBN.

Fictional character biography
Despite no origin ever being given for the Spider's appearance: pointed ears and teeth, and upswept eyebrows, it fits into the angular style of the artist Reg Bunn, who was most comfortable with designing and plotting the actions scenes from the scripts he was given by employing "triangular" artwork. This emphasized (and made easier) the interaction of subject matter and framing within each action picture. Reg Bunn commented later on in the 1960s of the humorous irony of the later Spock "borrowing" his ears. The character's face also bears a resemblance to the much-earlier comic character Namor.

The Spider appeared in the 1960s in the United States with the aim to become King of Crooks. His base of operations was a Scottish castle he brought over to the U.S. He broke out several other criminals to become members of his army of crime and would clash with both the police and with other criminal masterminds. Among these were Mirror Man (who specialised in illusions), Doctor Mysterioso (a multi-talented scientist) and The Android Emperor (who could create a wide variety of robots). He also clashed with a number of criminal gangs, and one organisation, Crime Incorporated, hired the assassin The Exterminator to kill him. For once, the Spider seemed defeated, but struck an alliance with his would-be killer, and the pair took down Crime Incorporated. The Spider drained the Exterminator, aging him decades with a booby-trapped handshake when the latter tried to double-cross him.

The Spider found fighting criminals to be exhilarating and decided to pit his wits against threats to mankind from now on. For a brief time, he was associated with the "Society of Heroes" (Captain Whiz; Mr. Gizmo; Rex Robot; Tigro the Wild Man; Rockman; Snowman (Professor Fred Storm)). All except The Spider died fighting the Sinister Seven. Other foes he faced included The Crime Genie, Spider-Boy, The Snake, The Death-Master, the Ant, the Red Baron, The Fly, The Molecule Man, The Chessman, and Mr. Stonehart.

An elder, now retired, version of The Spider has appeared in Jack Staff. This version does not seem to have become a hero and instead was active as an undefeated thief from the 1960s through the 80s in the UK. It's unclear if this Spider ever put together an army of crime, or only worked alone.

The character featured strongly in Albion, having been hired by the Margaret Thatcher government to hunt down all of the other British superheroes and adventurers, a job which appealed to his ego. He was promised a pardon but was double-crossed and locked up with those he captured. He escaped with the other inmates at the end of the series, taking the giant robot ape Mytek the Mighty with him.

Powers and abilities
It is unclear what powers, if any, The Spider has.  He is physically fit, but probably not any more than most humans.  He is supremely arrogant and self-confident. He is also cunning and intelligent, and a superb hypnotist. He has trained himself to be immune to his own knockout/poison gas.

The Spider wears a black form-fitting outfit (this costume was often coloured yellow on the covers of Lion and Stupendous Super Library), along with a strange backpack/harness. The harness serves as a jetpack and webshooters, as well as the sources for his web gun and gas gun. He has a large number of gadgets of his own invention at his disposal.

His reluctant allies are a pair of freed criminals, the genius 'Prof' Pelham and the safecracker Roy Ordini. They were the only members of his 'army of crime' to stay on after The Spider renounced his criminal ways. He treated them very badly and they often tried to harm, even kill him in return. Their failures often brought humiliating punishments from their master.

In his appearances in Jack Staff, the Spider states that his outfit serves as an exoskeleton, which increases his strength and agility.

Bibliography
His first three storylines from Lion (plus a bonus storyline from a Lion annual) have been reprinted in King of Crooks (2005, Titan Books ).

Other versions
As well as appearing in his own series he has appeared in a number of other British comics as himself in figures crafted as an homage:
 In Alan Moore's run on Captain Britain, a superhero called The Arachnid was killed by the Fury on Captain UK's world. He is seen (on the 15th page of the reprinted graphic novel) only as a gravestone amongst a number of others all also referencing versions of famous superheroes.
 In the Nikolai Dante series The Romanov Job as "Abel Ganz. The Tarantula. Anarchist. Assassin and all-round master criminal" (first appearance 2000AD #1282, 13 March 2002) alongside other similar characters based on Janus Stark ("Janos Starak: Escapologist Extraordinaire"), Catwoman ("Selina Solaris: The Panther") and Crusher Creel ("Grushko Kreel").
 Jack Staff as an aging figure and former adversary of the eponymous hero. He gives his name as "Alfred Chinard", but this may be an alias, as "A. Chinard" is an anagram for "Arachnid". So as not to infringe IPC Media copyright, he can now only be referred to as Alfred Chinard in further Jack Staff appearances.
 Albion which saw Alan Moore bring him back again, but this time as himself, along with the various other British superheroes of that era. The Spider is again referred to as "Alfred Chinard" in homage to Paul Grist's Jack Staff. When pointed out that his name is an anagram of Arachnid, he then gives the name Arthur O'Pod (Arthropod).
 In the novel Sherlock Holmes y los zombis de Camford (Sherlock Holmes and the Camford Zombies, Ediciones Dolmen, 2010) by Spanish author Alberto López Aroca, The Spider appears under the name "Seth Pride" (an anagram for "The Spider"), and his criminal-heroic career is set back to the beginning of the 20th century (the novel takes place in 1903). "Seth Pride" appears in this novel alongside a number of other IPC-Fleetway characters (Timothy Jekyll aka Tim Kelly; Lewis Crandle aka Louis "Steel Claw "Crandell; Mightech aka Mytek; among others).

References

External links
International Catalogue of Superheroes entry
The Spider History & Reviews
 Tamil Comics Ulagam - Complete Cover Gallery & Index of Spider in India
 Reprints of The Spider in Lion Comics

British comics
1965 comics debuts
Comics characters introduced in 1965
1969 comics endings
Fleetway and IPC Comics
Titan Books titles
Superhero comics
British comics characters
Male characters in comics